The 2006 Speedway World Cup Race-off was the third race of the 2006 Speedway World Cup season. It took place on 20 July 2006 in the Smallmead Stadium in Reading, Great Britain.

Results

Heat details

References

See also 
 2006 Speedway World Cup
 motorcycle speedway

R